Delta Chi (ΔΧ)  now has 137 chapters and 8 colonies across North America. Delta Chi has initiated over 118,000 men since founding in 1890.

Chapters

Provisional Chapters 

 University of Alaska-Anchorage
 University of Arizona
 Towson University
 High Point University
 Northern Arizona University
 Creighton University
 Temple University
 Villanova University
 University of Colorado, Boulder
 Quinnipiac University
 Southern Arkansas University
 Washington University in St. Louis
 Illinois State University
 Rowan University

Alumni Chapters
 Arizona Valley
 Atlanta Area
 Augusta Area
 Austin
 Boston Area
 Cape Fear Area
 Capital Area
 Central Florida
 Charlotte
 Columbus
 Connecticut Area
 Dallas/Fort Worth
 Edmonton, Alberta
 Greater Wisconsin Area
 Gurnet Point, MA
 Houston Area
 Illinois
 Kansas City Area
 Los Angeles
 Miami Area
 Monongahela Valley 
 Myrtle Beach
 Nashville
 New Orleans
 New York City
 Northeast Ohio Area
 Oakland, NJ
 Rio Grande Area
 Sacramento Area
 Seattle
 South Florida
 Tampa Bay Area
 Tennessee Valley
 Three Rivers
 Troy Area
 Twin Cities Area
 San Antonio

References

Map of Delta Chi Chapters and Colonies

Delta Chi
chapters